is the sixth major single (ninth overall) released by Japanese pop rock band Scandal. The title track was used as the theme song for the summer events Natsu Sacas 2010 Akasaka Big Bang and Utsunomiya Hanabi Taikai 2010, while the first B-side, "Koshi-Tantan", was used as an insert song in the anime film Loups=Garous. The first press of the single came with a special booklet. The single reached #10 on the Oricon weekly chart and charted for five weeks, selling 16,027 copies.

Track listing

References 

2010 singles
Songs written for films
Songs written by Tomomi Ogawa
Scandal (Japanese band) songs
Epic Records singles
2010 songs